Solomon's Seal is a 1980 thriller novel by the British writer Hammond Innes. It was published in the United Kingdom by Collins and in the United States by Knopf.

References

Bibliography
 James Vinson & D. L. Kirkpatrick. Contemporary Novelists. St. James Press, 1986.

1980 British novels
Novels by Hammond Innes
British thriller novels
William Collins, Sons books